The Lithuanian Handball League, is the top-tier team handball competition in the Republic of Lithuania.

Current teams 
Alytus
Alytaus Varsa - Stronglasas
Kaunas
Granitas Kaunas
Klaipėda
Dragūnas Klaipėda
Panevėžys

HC „Grifas-R.Sargūno sporto gimnazija-KKSC“
Šiauliai
SM Dubysa-Gubernija
Utena
HC Utena
Varėna
Ūla Varėna
Vilnius
HC Vilnius
VHC Šviesa

Lithuanian Handball League past champions

 1991 : Granitas Kaunas
 1992 : Granitas Kaunas (2)
 1993 : Granitas Kaunas (3)
 1994 : Granitas Kaunas (4)
 1995 : Granitas Kaunas (5)
 1996 : Granitas Kaunas (6)
 1997 : Granitas Kaunas (7)
 1998 : Granitas Kaunas (8)
 1999 : Granitas Kaunas (9)
 2000 : Granitas Kaunas (10)
 2001 : Granitas Kaunas (11)

 2002 : Granitas Kaunas (12)
 2003 : Granitas Kaunas (13)
 2004 : Granitas Kaunas (14)
 2005 : Granitas Kaunas (15)
 2006 : Panevėžio Viking Malt
 2007 : Panevėžio Viking Malt (2)
 2008 : Granitas Kaunas (16) 
 2009 : Granitas Kaunas (17)
 2010 : Dragūnas Klaipėda
 2011 : Dragūnas Klaipėda (2)

 2012 : Dragūnas Klaipėda (3)
 2013 : Dragūnas Klaipėda (4) 
 2014 : Dragūnas Klaipėda (5)
 2015 : Dragūnas Klaipėda (6)
 2016 : Varsa Alytus
 2017 : Dragūnas Klaipėda (7)
 2018 : Dragūnas Klaipėda (8)
 2019 : Dragūnas Klaipėda (9)
 2020 : Cancelled
 2021 : VHC Šviesa (1)
 2022 : VHC Šviesa (2)

References

External links
 Official website
 Lithuanian Handball Federation

 
Lithuania
1992 establishments in Lithuania
Professional sports leagues in Lithuania